A by-election was held for the New South Wales Legislative Assembly electorate of Paterson on 18 March 1875 caused by the death of William Arnold.

Dates

Results

William Arnold died.

See also
Electoral results for the district of Paterson
List of New South Wales state by-elections

References

1875 elections in Australia
New South Wales state by-elections
1870s in New South Wales